The 2012–13 San Francisco Dons men's basketball team represented the University of San Francisco during the 2012–13 college basketball season. This was head coach Rex Walters fifth season at San Francisco. The Dons played their home games at the War Memorial Gymnasium and were members of the West Coast Conference. They finished the season 15–16, 7–9 in WCC play to finish in a tie for fifth place. They lost in the second round of the WCC tournament to Loyola Marymount.

Before the Season

Departures

Recruits

Roster

Schedule and results
The Dons will participate in a 5-day foreign tour in Cancun, Mexico August 12–16. During the tour they will play 3 games against 2 teams from the Liga Nacional de Baloncesto Profesional.

|-
!colspan=12 style="background:#FFCC33; color:#006633;"| Exhibition Season

|-
!colspan=12 style="background:#006633; color:#FFCC33;"| Non-conference Regular Season

|-
!colspan=12 style="background:#006633; color:#FFCC33;"| WCC Regular Season

|-
!colspan=12 style="background:#FFCC33; color:#006633;"| 2013 West Coast Conference men's basketball tournament

|-
!colspan=12 style="background:#006633; color:#FFCC33;"| Non-conference Regular Season

References

San Francisco Dons men's basketball seasons
San Francisco
San Francisco Dons
San Francisco Dons